A trypanocidal agent is an antiprotozoal agent that acts upon trypanosome parasites.

Examples include:
 Aminoquinuride
 benzonidazole
 blasticidin S
 DAPI
 diminazene
 diminazene aceturate
 eflornithine
 ethidium
 isometamidium chloride
 lonidamine
 melaminylthioarsenate
 melarsoprol
 nifurtimox
 pentamidine
 posaconazole
 puromycin
 quinapyramine
 salicylhydroxamic acid
 suramin
 tetraphenylporphine sulfonate

Resistance
 17 or 18 African countries had confirmed resistant parasite populations, and  that was up to 21. Multiply resistant populations are an increasing problem in the Adamawa Region of Cameroon and south east Mali. The Gibe River Valley in southwest Ethiopia showed universal resistance (in T. congolense isolated from Boran cattle) between July 1989 and February 1993. This likely indicates a permanent loss of function in this area for the tested trypanocides, Diminazene aceturate, Isometamidium chloride, and Homidium chloride.

See also
 Trypanosomiasis vaccine

References

Antiprotozoal agents